Eliza McNitt is an American writer and director who specializes in blending science with art. In 2018 she was an Emmy Awards finalist and Grand Prize winner for the VR category at the Venice Film Festival. Other festivals that have exhibited her work includes SXSW, AFI Fest, Cannes NEXT, Tribeca, Telluride, and Sundance, where McNitt secured the first seven figure deal in VR film festival history for her project SPHERES.

Career 
Eliza's first documentary, Requiem for the Honeybee, took inspiration from her deep concern for vanishing honeybees and was broadcast internationally. Following that, McNitt released the films Without Fire, a survival story of a girl trying to keep her mother warm during a harsh Winter starring Magdalena Begay (Drunktown's Finest) and Misty Upham (Frozen River, August: Osage County), and Artemis Falls starring Adepero Oduye (Pariah, 12 Years A Slave) which was commissioned by TED and follows an astronaut on her journey into space.

After this came McNitt's first VR experience, Fistful of Stars, which focused on the explorations of The Hubble Telescope and drew an audience of over 6,000 people at BRIC! Celebrate Brooklyn. This was only the beginning of McNitt's success in the VR industry, however, which with her release of SPHERES swiftly placed her in the history books as one of the most profitable VR visionary's to date. Executive Produced by Darren Aronofsky, with a star studded cast of Millie Bobby Brown (Stranger Things), Jessica Chastain (Tree of Life, Interstellar), and Patti Smith, SPHERES became the first VR experience to debut at the Telluride Film Festival and was world's first VR experience to be acquired out of the Sundance Film Festival for seven figures.

Awards and nominations

References 

American screenwriters
American film directors
Year of birth missing (living people)
Living people